Abbasabad (also Romanized as ‘Abbāsābād) is a village in Mazraeh-ye Shomali Rural District, Voshmgir District, Aqqala County, Golestan Province, Iran. At the 2006 census, its population was 434, in 92 families.

References 

Populated places in Aqqala County